Alonzo Ridley, (June 3, 1826 – March 25, 1909) was a 49er, trader, Indian agent, engineer, Undersheriff of Los Angeles County, Confederate Army officer from California, who led the Los Angeles Mounted Rifles on their epic march across the Southwestern deserts from California to Texas in 1861.

Ridley was born in 1826 in Bowdoin, Maine. He lived in New England until 1849, when he left Massachusetts for California.

References

External links
Gene C. Armistead, "California's Confederate Militia: The Los Angeles Mounted Rifles," California and the Civil War, The California Military Museum.
Albert Sydney Johnson:  Soldier of Three Republics.
The Confederate Veteran Magazine.

1826 births
1909 deaths
People from Sagadahoc County, Maine
People of the California Gold Rush
United States Indian agents
People of California in the American Civil War
Confederate States Army officers
People from Los Angeles County, California